Patrick Mwamba (born 4 January 1964) is a Zambian boxer. He competed at the 1984 Summer Olympics and the 1988 Summer Olympics. At the 1988 Summer Olympics, he lost to Esteban Flores of Puerto Rico.

References

External links
 

1964 births
Living people
Zambian male boxers
Olympic boxers of Zambia
Boxers at the 1984 Summer Olympics
Boxers at the 1988 Summer Olympics
Place of birth missing (living people)
Featherweight boxers